Daphne arisanensis is a shrub, of the family Thymelaeaceae.  It is native to Taiwan, specifically Yushan.

Description
The shrub is evergreen, and grows from 2.0 to 3.0 meters tall. Its branches are grayish and slender. The plant bears orange fruits. It is often found in forests at an altitude of around 3000 meters.

References

arisanensis
Taxa named by Bunzō Hayata